This is a list of the mammal species recorded in Burundi. There are 155 mammal species in Burundi, of which two are endangered, ten are vulnerable, and three are near threatened.

The following tags are used to highlight each species' conservation status as assessed by the International Union for Conservation of Nature:

Some species were assessed using an earlier set of criteria. Species assessed using this system have the following instead of near threatened and least concern categories:

Order: Tubulidentata (aardvarks) 

The order Tubulidentata consists of a single species, the aardvark. Tubulidentata are characterised by their teeth which lack a pulp cavity and form thin tubes which are continuously worn down and replaced.

Family: Orycteropodidae
Genus: Orycteropus
 Aardvark, O. afer

Order: Hyracoidea (hyraxes) 
The hyraxes are any of four species of fairly small, thickset, herbivorous mammals in the order Hyracoidea. About the size of a domestic cat they are well-furred, with rounded bodies and a stumpy tail. They are native to Africa and the Middle East.

Family: Procaviidae (hyraxes)
Genus: Heterohyrax
 Yellow-spotted rock hyrax, Heterohyrax brucei LC

Order: Proboscidea (elephants) 

The elephants comprise three living species and are the largest living land animals.
Family: Elephantidae (elephants)
Genus: Loxodonta
African bush elephant, L. africana  extirpated

Order: Primates 

The order Primates contains humans and their closest relatives: lemurs, lorisoids, tarsiers, monkeys, and apes.

Suborder: Strepsirrhini
Infraorder: Lemuriformes
Family: Lorisidae (lorises, bushbabies)
Genus: Perodicticus
 Potto, Perodicticus potto LR/lc
Family: Galagidae
Genus: Galago
 Dusky bushbaby, Galago matschiei LR/nt
 Mohol bushbaby, Galago moholi LR/lc
 Thomas's bushbaby, Galago thomasi LR/lc
Genus: Galagoides
 Prince Demidoff's bushbaby, Galagoides demidovii LR/lc
Genus: Otolemur
 Brown greater galago, Otolemur crassicaudatus LR/lc
Suborder: Haplorhini
Infraorder: Simiiformes
Parvorder: Catarrhini
Superfamily: Cercopithecoidea
Family: Cercopithecidae (Old World monkeys)
Genus: Chlorocebus
 Vervet monkey, Chlorocebus' pygerythrus LR/lc
Genus: Cercopithecus
 Red-tailed monkey, Cercopithecus ascanius LR/lc
 L'Hoest's monkey, Cercopithecus lhoesti LR/nt
 Blue monkey, Cercopithecus mitis LR/lc
Genus: Lophocebus
 Grey-cheeked mangabey, Lophocebus albigena LR/lc
Genus: Papio
 Olive baboon, Papio anubis LR/lc
Subfamily: Colobinae
Genus: Colobus
 Angola colobus, Colobus angolensis LR/lc
Superfamily: Hominoidea
Family: Hominidae (great apes)
Subfamily: Homininae
Tribe: Hominini
Genus: Pan
 Common chimpanzee, Pan troglodytes EN

Order: Rodentia (rodents) 
Rodents make up the largest order of mammals, with over 40% of mammalian species. They have two incisors in the upper and lower jaw which grow continually and must be kept short by gnawing. Most rodents are small though the capybara can weigh up to 45 kg (100 lb).

Suborder: Hystricomorpha
Family: Hystricidae (Old World porcupines)
Genus: Hystrix
 Cape porcupine, Hystrix africaeaustralis LC
Family: Thryonomyidae (cane rats)
Genus: Thryonomys
 Greater cane rat, Thryonomys swinderianus LC
Suborder: Sciurognathi
Family: Sciuridae (squirrels)
Subfamily: Xerinae
Tribe: Protoxerini
Genus: Funisciurus
 Carruther's mountain squirrel, Funisciurus carruthersi LC
 Fire-footed rope squirrel, Funisciurus pyrropus LC
Genus: Heliosciurus
 Red-legged sun squirrel, Heliosciurus rufobrachium LC
 Ruwenzori sun squirrel, Heliosciurus ruwenzorii LC
Genus: Paraxerus
 Boehm's bush squirrel, Paraxerus boehmi LC
Genus: Protoxerus
 Forest giant squirrel, Protoxerus stangeri LC
Family: Spalacidae
Subfamily: Rhizomyinae
Genus: Tachyoryctes
 Rwanda African mole-rat, Tachyoryctes ruandae LC
Family: Nesomyidae
Subfamily: Dendromurinae
Genus: Dendromus
 Kivu climbing mouse, Dendromus kivu LC
Subfamily: Cricetomyinae
Genus: Cricetomys
 Cricetomys emini LC
 Gambian pouched rat, Cricetomys gambianus LC
Family: Muridae (mice, rats, voles, gerbils, hamsters, etc.)
Subfamily: Deomyinae
Genus: Lophuromys
 Woosnam's brush-furred rat, Lophuromys woosnami LC
Subfamily: Otomyinae
Genus: Otomys
 Dent's vlei rat, Otomys denti NT
 Tropical vlei rat, Otomys tropicalis LC
Subfamily: Gerbillinae
Genus: Tatera
 Boehm's gerbil, Tatera boehmi LC
 Kemp's gerbil, Tatera kempi LC
 Savanna gerbil, Tatera valida LC
Subfamily: Murinae
Genus: Aethomys
 Hinde's rock rat, Aethomys hindei LC
 Kaiser's rock rat, Aethomys kaiseri LC
Genus: Arvicanthis
 African grass rat, Arvicanthis niloticus LC
Genus: Colomys
 African wading rat, Colomys goslingi LC
Genus: Grammomys
 Woodland thicket rat, Grammomys dolichurus LC
 Forest thicket rat, Grammomys dryas NT
 Shining thicket rat, Grammomys rutilans LC
Genus: Hybomys
 Peters's striped mouse, Hybomys univittatus LC
Genus: Hylomyscus
 Beaded wood mouse, Hylomyscus aeta LC
 Montane wood mouse, Hylomyscus denniae LC
 Stella wood mouse, Hylomyscus stella LC
Genus: Lemniscomys
 Typical striped grass mouse, Lemniscomys striatus LC
Genus: Mastomys
 Guinea multimammate mouse, Mastomys erythroleucus LC
 Natal multimammate mouse, Mastomys natalensis LC
Genus: Mus
 Toad mouse, Mus bufo LC
 African pygmy mouse, Mus minutoides LC
 Gray-bellied pygmy mouse, Mus triton LC
Genus: Oenomys
 Rufous-nosed rat, Oenomys hypoxanthus LC
Genus: Pelomys
 Creek groove-toothed swamp rat, Pelomys fallax LC
 Hopkins's groove-toothed swamp rat, Pelomys hopkinsi VU
Genus: Praomys
 Praomys degraaffi VU
 Jackson's soft-furred mouse, Praomys jacksoni LC
Genus: Thamnomys
 Kemp's thicket rat, Thamnomys kempi VU
Genus: Zelotomys
 Hildegarde's broad-headed mouse, Zelotomys hildegardeae LC

Order: Lagomorpha (lagomorphs) 

The lagomorphs comprise two families, Leporidae (hares and rabbits), and Ochotonidae (pikas). Though they can resemble rodents, and were classified as a superfamily in that order until the early 20th century, they have since been considered a separate order. They differ from rodents in a number of physical characteristics, such as having four incisors in the upper jaw rather than two.

Family: Leporidae (rabbits, hares)
Genus: Poelagus
 Bunyoro rabbit, Poelagus marjorita LR/lc
Genus: Lepus
 Cape hare, Lepus capensis LR/lc
 African savanna hare, Lepus microtis LR/lc

Order: Erinaceomorpha (hedgehogs and gymnures) 

The order Erinaceomorpha contains a single family, Erinaceidae, which comprise the hedgehogs and gymnures. The hedgehogs are easily recognised by their spines while gymnures look more like large rats.

Family: Erinaceidae (hedgehogs)
Subfamily: Erinaceinae
Genus: Atelerix
 Four-toed hedgehog, Atelerix albiventris LR/lc

Order: Soricomorpha (shrews, moles, and solenodons) 

The "shrew-forms" are insectivorous mammals. The shrews and solenodons closely resemble mice while the moles are stout-bodied burrowers.

Family: Soricidae (shrews)
Subfamily: Crocidurinae
Genus: Crocidura
 Long-tailed musk shrew, Crocidura dolichura LC
 Bicolored musk shrew, Crocidura fuscomurina LC
 Hildegarde's shrew, Crocidura hildegardeae LC
 Jackson's shrew, Crocidura jacksoni LC
 Moonshine shrew, Crocidura luna LC
 Dark shrew, Crocidura maurisca DD
 African black shrew, Crocidura nigrofusca LC
 Niobe's shrew, Crocidura niobe LC
 African giant shrew, Crocidura olivieri LC
 Small-footed shrew, Crocidura parvipes LC
 Turbo shrew, Crocidura turba LC
Genus: Paracrocidura
 Greater large-headed shrew, Paracrocidura maxima NT
Genus: Ruwenzorisorex
 Ruwenzori shrew, Ruwenzorisorex suncoides VU
Genus: Scutisorex
 Armored shrew, Scutisorex somereni LC
Genus: Sylvisorex
 Johnston's forest shrew, Sylvisorex johnstoni LC
 Moon forest shrew, Sylvisorex lunaris LC
 Climbing shrew, Sylvisorex megalura LC
 Volcano shrew, Sylvisorex vulcanorum LC
Subfamily: Myosoricinae
Genus: Myosorex
 Babault's mouse shrew, Myosorex babaulti VU

Order: Chiroptera (bats) 

The bats' most distinguishing feature is that their forelimbs are developed as wings, making them the only mammals capable of flight. Bat species account for about 20% of all mammals.

Family: Pteropodidae (flying foxes, Old World fruit bats)
Subfamily: Pteropodinae
Genus: Eidolon
 Straw-coloured fruit bat, Eidolon helvum LC
Genus: Epomophorus
 Ethiopian epauletted fruit bat, Epomophorus labiatus LC
 Wahlberg's epauletted fruit bat, Epomophorus wahlbergi LC
Genus: Lissonycteris
 Angolan rousette, Lissonycteris angolensis LC
Genus: Micropteropus
 Peters's dwarf epauletted fruit bat, Micropteropus pusillus LC
Genus: Rousettus
 Egyptian fruit bat, Rousettus aegyptiacus LC
Family: Vespertilionidae
Subfamily: Myotinae
Genus: Myotis
 Rufous mouse-eared bat, Myotis bocagii LC
 Welwitsch's bat, Myotis welwitschii LC
Subfamily: Vespertilioninae
Genus: Glauconycteris
 Silvered bat, Glauconycteris argentata LC
Genus: Neoromicia
 Cape serotine, Neoromicia capensis LC
 Yellow serotine, Neoromicia flavescens DD
 Banana pipistrelle, Neoromicia nanus LC
 White-winged serotine, Neoromicia tenuipinnis LC
Genus: Pipistrellus
 Rüppell's pipistrelle, Pipistrellus rueppelli LC
Genus: Scotophilus
 African yellow bat, Scotophilus dinganii LC
Family: Molossidae
Genus: Chaerephon
 Spotted free-tailed bat, Chaerephon bivittata LC
 Nigerian free-tailed bat, Chaerephon nigeriae LC
 Little free-tailed bat, Chaerephon pumila LC
Genus: Mops
 Angolan free-tailed bat, Mops condylurus LC
 Midas free-tailed bat, Mops midas LC
Family: Nycteridae
Genus: Nycteris
 Bate's slit-faced bat, Nycteris arge LC
 Hairy slit-faced bat, Nycteris hispida LC
 Large-eared slit-faced bat, Nycteris macrotis LC
 Egyptian slit-faced bat, Nycteris thebaica LC
Family: Megadermatidae
Genus: Lavia
 Yellow-winged bat, Lavia frons LC
Family: Rhinolophidae
Subfamily: Rhinolophinae
Genus: Rhinolophus
 Geoffroy's horseshoe bat, Rhinolophus clivosus LC
 Darling's horseshoe bat, Rhinolophus darlingi LC
 Rüppell's horseshoe bat, Rhinolophus fumigatus LC
 Hildebrandt's horseshoe bat, Rhinolophus hildebrandti LC
 Lander's horseshoe bat, Rhinolophus landeri LC
Subfamily: Hipposiderinae
Genus: Hipposideros
 Sundevall's roundleaf bat, Hipposideros caffer LC
 Noack's roundleaf bat, Hipposideros ruber LC

Order: Pholidota (pangolins) 

The order Pholidota comprises the eight species of pangolin. Pangolins are anteaters and have the powerful claws, elongated snout and long tongue seen in the other unrelated anteater species.

Family: Manidae
Genus: Manis
 Giant pangolin, Manis gigantea LR/lc
 Long-tailed pangolin, Manis tetradactyla LR/lc

Order: Carnivora (carnivorans) 

There are over 260 species of carnivorans, the majority of which feed primarily on meat. They have a characteristic skull shape and dentition.
Suborder: Feliformia
Family: Felidae (cats)
Subfamily: Felinae
Genus: Leptailurus
 Serval, Leptailurus serval LC
Genus: Caracal
African golden cat, C. aurata  presence uncertain
Subfamily: Pantherinae
Genus: Panthera
 Leopard, Panthera pardus VU
Family: Nandiniidae
Genus: Nandinia
 African palm civet, Nandinia binotata LC
Family: Herpestidae (mongooses)
Genus: Mungos
 Banded mongoose, Mungos mungo LC
Family: Hyaenidae (hyaenas)
Genus: Crocuta
 Spotted hyena, Crocuta crocuta LC
Suborder: Caniformia
Family: Canidae (dogs, foxes)
Genus: Lupulella
 Side-striped jackal, L. adusta  
Genus: Lycaon
 African wild dog, L. pictus  extirpated
Family: Mustelidae (mustelids)
Genus: Ictonyx
 Striped polecat, Ictonyx striatus LC
Genus: Poecilogale
 African striped weasel, Poecilogale albinucha LC
Genus: Mellivora
 Honey badger, Mellivora capensis LC
Genus: Hydrictis
 Speckle-throated otter, H. maculicollis NT possibly extirpated
Genus: Aonyx
 Cameroon clawless otter, Aonyx congicus NT presence uncertain

Order: Perissodactyla (odd-toed ungulates) 

The odd-toed ungulates are browsing and grazing mammals. They are usually large to very large, and have relatively simple stomachs and a large middle toe.

Family: Equidae (horses etc.)
Genus: Equus
Plains zebra, E. quagga  extirpated
 Grant's zebra, E. q. boehmi extirpated

Order: Artiodactyla (even-toed ungulates) 

The even-toed ungulates are ungulates whose weight is borne about equally by the third and fourth toes, rather than mostly or entirely by the third as in perissodactyls. There are about 220 artiodactyl species, including many that are of great economic importance to humans.
Family: Suidae (pigs)
Subfamily: Phacochoerinae
Genus: Phacochoerus
 Common warthog, Phacochoerus africanus LR/lc
Subfamily: Suinae
Genus: Hylochoerus
 Giant forest hog, Hylochoerus meinertzhageni LR/lc
Genus: Potamochoerus
 Bushpig, Potamochoerus larvatus LR/lc
Family: Hippopotamidae (hippopotamuses)
Genus: Hippopotamus
Hippopotamus, H. amphibius  
Family: Tragulidae
Genus: Hyemoschus
 Water chevrotain, Hyemoschus aquaticus LC
Family: Bovidae (cattle, antelope, sheep, goats)
Subfamily: Alcelaphinae
Genus: Alcelaphus
 Hartebeest, Alcelaphus busephalus LC extirpated
Genus: Damaliscus
 Topi, Damaliscus lunatus LR/cd
Subfamily: Antilopinae
Genus: Oreotragus
 Klipspringer, Oreotragus oreotragus LR/cd
Genus: Ourebia
 Oribi, Ourebia ourebi LR/cd
Subfamily: Bovinae
Genus: Syncerus
 African buffalo, Syncerus caffer LR/cd
Genus: Tragelaphus
 Common eland, Tragelaphus oryx LR/cd extirpated
 Bushbuck, Tragelaphus scriptus LR/lc
 Sitatunga, Tragelaphus spekii LR/nt
Subfamily: Cephalophinae
Genus: Cephalophus
 Blue duiker, Cephalophus monticola LR/lc
 Black-fronted duiker, Cephalophus nigrifrons LR/nt
 Yellow-backed duiker, Cephalophus silvicultor LR/nt
 Weyns's duiker, Cephalophus weynsi LR/nt
Genus: Sylvicapra
 Common duiker, Sylvicapra grimmia LR/lc
Subfamily: Hippotraginae
Genus: Hippotragus
 Roan antelope, Hippotragus equinus LC extirpated
Subfamily: Aepycerotinae
Genus: Aepyceros
 Impala, Aepyceros melampus LC extirpated
Subfamily: Reduncinae
Genus: Kobus
 Waterbuck, Kobus ellipsiprymnus LR/cd
Genus: Redunca
 Bohor reedbuck, Redunca redunca LR/cd

Notes

References

See also
List of chordate orders
Lists of mammals by region
List of prehistoric mammals
Mammal classification
List of mammals described in the 2000s

Burundi
Mammals

Burundi